Phyllonorycter staintoniella is a moth of the family Gracillariidae. It is found from Sweden to the Pyrenees, Sardinia, Italy and Bulgaria and from Great Britain to Poland and Romania.

The wingspan is 4.5–7 mm.

The larvae feed on Chamaecytisus austriacus, Chamaecytisus ratisbonensis, Cytisus procumbens, Cytisus scoparius, Genista baetica, Genista pilosa, Genista scorpius, Genista tinctoria, Laburnum anagyroides and Lembotropis nigricans. They mine the leaves of their host plant. They create an upper-surface tentiform mine. The mine is strongly contracted, almost folding the leaflet to a pod and concealing the mine. Pupation takes place in a flimsy cocoon in the basal part of the mine. The pupa is always directed towards the petiole. The frass is deposited in the distal corner of the mine.

References

staintoniella
Moths of Europe
Moths described in 1853